Small Faces is the debut album of Small Faces, released in May 1966 by Decca Records. It includes the hit singles "Whatcha Gonna Do About It" and "Sha-La-La-La-Lee". The album was well received by music critics and was popular with the public, rising to number 3 on the UK album chart remaining at the top for several weeks. It also reached number 8 in Finland.

Album profile
The album was recorded at IBC Studios, Portland Place, London between June 1965 and February 1966. Glyn Johns was the studio engineer. In 1966, Small Faces became the eleventh biggest selling artists of the year.

Jimmy Winston was asked to leave after the band's second single "I've Got Mine", released on 5 November 1965, failed to make the charts. He still appears on many tracks on this album, including joint writing contributions to "It's Too Late" and providing keyboards and vocals on various tracks. Winston's replacement, Ian McLagan, appears on the album cover and plays on various tracks as well.

In 1962, Muddy Waters recorded "You Need Love", written for him by peer Willie Dixon. "You Need Loving" is a thinly veiled cover of "You Need Love". Small Faces were never sued by Dixon, even though "You Need Loving" only credits Ronnie Lane and Steve Marriott as writers. Guitarist Jimmy Page (initially of The Yardbirds and later of Led Zeppelin fame) has claimed to have been disappointed when, after coming up with a wicked guitar riff and requesting Robert Plant pen some lyrics, the singer returned with those of "You Need Loving", a tune Plant, a big Small Faces fan, had, according to Small Faces singer Steve Marriott in early 70s Canadian rock newspaper Beetle, said he had longed to record. Thus, "You Need Loving" became the basis for lyrics of Led Zeppelin's hit song "Whole Lotta Love" in 1969.

Three of the tracks had been released prior to the album. These are the two aforementioned singles "Whatcha Gonna Do About It" and "Sha-La-La-La-Lee", along with the track "It's Too Late" which was issued as the B-side of "I've Got Mine", the group's second single, released in 1965. The band's fourth single "Hey Girl" was released around the same time as the album; ultimately it was not included and can instead be found on their 1967 compilation album From the Beginning.  "Own Up Time" was incorrectly titled "Own Up" on initial pressings from 1966, on newer issues of the album the initial name has been reinstated.

Track listing

2012 Deluxe edition 
The album was completely remastered in 2012 and reissued as compact discs with previously unreleased material, along with various A-sides and B-sides from 1965 to 1967.(* Willie Dixon wrote the lyrics for "You Need Loving", on the album the song is credited to Steve Marriott and Ronnie Lane)

Singles 
For more information on the single releases please see their respective pages.

Personnel
Small Faces
Steve Marriott – lead guitar, lead vocals (all but 1, 8), backing vocals
Ronnie Lane – bass, backing vocals, lead vocals (1)
Kenney Jones – drums, percussion
Ian McLagan (1, 3, 5, 7, 8, 9, 12) – keyboards, backing vocals
with:
Jimmy Winston (2, 4, 6, 10, 11) – keyboards, backing vocals, rhythm guitar
Kenny Lynch (3, 7, 12) – backing vocals

Additional releases
The album was first released on CD in 1988 by London Records. This edition included four bonus tracks taken from three singles B-sides and one A-side; "What's A Matter Baby", "I Got Mine", "Grow Your Own" and "Almost Grown". 15 of this CD's 16 tracks were in mono, the exception being a stereo mix of "Sha La La La Lee".

It was first remastered for CD in 1997 by Deram Records, and this time the bonus tracks were alternative versions of "Shake", "Come on Children", "What'cha Gonna Do About It", "Own Up Time" and "E Too D".

In 2006 a "40th anniversary edition" with 23 tracks was released by Decca. Included were the Singles A-Sides and Singles B-Sides from that period, "What's A Matter Baby", I've Got Mine", "Grow Your Own", "Hey Girl" and "Almost Grown".

In 2012, a 2-disc Deluxe Edition was released featuring outtakes, non-album singles and alternate versions and mixes, and the remastering and overall reissue was overseen by surviving band members Ian McLagan and Kenney Jones.

Notes

External links
Room for Ravers (unofficial Small Faces website)

1966 debut albums
Decca Records albums
Small Faces albums
Albums produced by Ian Samwell
Albums recorded at IBC Studios
Garage rock albums by English artists